Paul Johnson (born 25 May 1959) is an English former footballer who played for Stoke City, Shrewsbury Town and York City in the Football League.

Career
Born in Stoke-on-Trent, Staffordshire, Johnson progressed through the Stoke City youth system, before turning professional in May 1977. He was unable to affirm himself as a regular in the first team and, after making 34 league appearances, he joined Shrewsbury Town in May 1981. After making 180 appearances and scoring three goals in the league for Shrewsbury, he joined York City in July 1987 and was appointed as captain. He spent two seasons at the club, making 96 appearances and scoring one goal, before joining Football Conference team Macclesfield Town in 1989. He made 108 appearances and scored two goals in the league, before joining Leek Town while working as Stoke's Community Development Officer.

Career statistics
Source:

A.  The "Other" column constitutes appearances and goals in the Football League Group Cup, Football League Trophy and Full Members Cup.

References

1959 births
Living people
Footballers from Stoke-on-Trent
English footballers
Association football defenders
Stoke City F.C. players
Shrewsbury Town F.C. players
York City F.C. players
Macclesfield Town F.C. players
Leek Town F.C. players
English Football League players
National League (English football) players